George William Lowe (25 May 1915 – 30 April 2008) was an English cricketer who played first-class cricket for Derbyshire in 1949 and 1953.

Lowe was born in the village of Mastin Moor, near  Staveley, Derbyshire. He started playing for Derbyshire in the second XI in 1948.

He made his debut for the Derbyshire team in the 1949 season against Kent when he made 22 in his second innings. It was his only first team appearance in the year and he continued playing in the second XI until 1956.

He made one more first-class appearance in the 1953 season against Somerset, when he made 21 in the only innings he played.

Lowe was a right-handed batsman  and played three innings in two first-class matches with an average of 14.33 and a top score of 22.

References

1915 births
2008 deaths
English cricketers
Derbyshire cricketers
People from Staveley, Derbyshire
Cricketers from Derbyshire